TROX-1 is a drug which acts as a potent blocker of the Cav2 type calcium channels. It was developed as a potential analgesic after the discovery that the selective Cav2.2 blocker ziconotide is an active analgesic with similar efficacy to strong opioid drugs. Unlike ziconotide, TROX-1 is not so selective, and also blocks the Cav2.1 and Cav2.3 calcium channel subtypes, but it has the great advantage of being orally active, whereas ziconotide must be administered intrathecally, by injection into the spinal fluid. In animal studies of TROX-1, analgesic effects were observed with similar efficacy to NSAIDs such as naproxen or diclofenac, and anti-allodynia effects equivalent to pregabalin or duloxetine.

References 

Calcium channel blockers